Toalepaialii Toeolesulusulu Salesa III (died November 2008) was a high chief (matai) of Satapuala village and a Member of Parliament of the Aana District in Samoa. In the late 1980s, he was a Cabinet Minister and chairman of the country's national airline, Polynesian Airlines. Toalepaialii was also a leader of the Samoa Progressive Political Party. He was involved in a legal action against the government over a land claim by his village involving more than two thousand hectares near Faleolo International Airport.

See also
Politics of Samoa
Fa'amatai, chiefly system of governance in the Samoa Islands

References

Members of the Legislative Assembly of Samoa
2008 deaths
Samoan chiefs
Government ministers of Samoa
People from A'ana
Samoa Progressive Political Party politicians
Year of birth missing